The James Madison class of submarine was an evolutionary development from the  of fleet ballistic missile submarine. They were identical to the Lafayettes except for being initially designed to carry the Polaris A-3 missile instead of the earlier A-2. This class and the Benjamin Franklin class are combined with the Lafayettes in some references.

Design

In the early 1970s all were modified for the Poseidon C-3 missile. During the late 1970s and early 1980s, six boats were further modified to carry the Trident I C-4 missile, along with six Benjamin Franklin-class boats. These were James Madison, Daniel Boone, John C. Calhoun, Von Steuben, Casimir Pulaski, and Stonewall Jackson.

Fate
The James Madisons were decommissioned between 1986 and 1995 due to a combination of SALT II treaty limitations as the  SSBNs entered service, age, and the collapse of the Soviet Union. One (Sam Rayburn) remains out of commission but converted to a Moored Training Ship (MTS-635) with the missile compartment removed. She is stationed at Norfolk Naval Shipyard in Portsmouth, VA for inactivation.

Boats in class 
Submarines of the James Madison class: (Submarines marked with * indicate Trident I C-4 ballistic missile conversions.)

See also 
 41 for Freedom Fleet Ballistic Missile submarines
 Fleet Ballistic Missile
 List of submarines of the United States Navy
 List of submarine classes of the United States Navy

References

Gardiner, Robert and Chumbley, Stephen (editors). Conway's All the World's Fighting Ships 1947–1995. Annapolis, US: Naval Institute Press, 1995. .
Polmar, Norman. The Ships and Aircraft of the U.S. Fleet: Twelfth Edition. London:Arms and Armour Press, 1981. .
US Naval Vessel Register – List of SSBN BALLISTIC MISSILE SUBMARINE (NUCLEAR-POWERED) Class vessels

External links

 NavSource.org SSBN photo gallery index

Submarine classes
 
Nuclear-powered submarines
Ballistic missile submarines
 James Madison class